The 2021–22 figure skating season began on July 1, 2021 and ended on June 30, 2022. During this season, elite skaters competed on the ISU Championship level at the 2022 European, Four Continents, World Junior, and World Championships, as well as at the 2022 Winter Olympics. They also competed at elite events such as the Grand Prix and Junior Grand Prix series, and the ISU Challenger Series.

As a result of the COVID-19 pandemic, the Grand Prix Final was cancelled, while parts of the Junior Grand Prix, Grand Prix, and Challenger Series were not held as scheduled. Among the ISU Championships events, the Four Continents Championships were relocated, and the World Junior Championships were postponed and relocated. Due to re-allocations, the Estonian Skating Union hosted three of the four ISU Championships events this season.

Beginning from the 2021–22 season, the International Skating Union officially changed the terminology in all ISU rules and events from "ladies" to "women".

On March 1, 2022, the ISU banned all figure skaters and officials from Russia and Belarus from attending any international competitions due to the 2022 Russian invasion of Ukraine.

Impact of the COVID-19 pandemic 
The ISU acknowledged two key challenges in organizing the season due to the ongoing COVID-19 pandemic: entry restrictions into host countries and/or return to the home countries and limited air travel options. However, the ISU remained committed to having a full calendar of events with modifications as necessary, and issued the following statement: 

On August 5, the ISU announced that due to varying travel and quarantine restrictions during the pandemic, it would consider re-allocation requests for the Junior Grand Prix series on a case-by-case basis according to an outlined criteria of preference. The ISU also said that they would abandon the re-allocation process in the event of an abundance of requests or overly complex requests that would cause logistical issues. In addition, the ISU decided not to implement a JGP ranking for the season and to instead prioritize holding the JGP series safely "with the best possible participation" in light of the pandemic. In October, the ISU announced alternative qualification criteria for the 2021–22 Junior Grand Prix Final.

On August 16, the ISU announced the cancellation of the third Grand Prix event, the 2021 Cup of China, citing the limited number of international flights to China and strict COVID-19 pandemic restrictions. In an attempt to preserve the Grand Prix series, the ISU asked for other ISU members to apply as alternate hosts on the originally scheduled dates. On August 27, the Gran Premio d'Italia was named as the replacement event. On December 2, the ISU announced that the 2021–22 Grand Prix Final would not be able to be held as scheduled in Osaka, Japan and that they were considering the possibility of postponement to later in the season. The event was definitively cancelled on December 17.

On September 13, the Chinese Skating Association announced the cancellation of the 2022 Four Continents Championships for similar reasons as Cup of China. The ISU again asked for other members to apply as alternate hosts on the originally scheduled dates. After receiving no applications from non-European members, the ISU asked the Estonian Skating Union, the host of the European Championships, to host the Four Continents Championships in the same venue the following week (the originally scheduled dates).

On February 12, the ISU announced that the 2022 World Junior Championships could not be held as planned due to concerns about a surge in omicron variant cases in Bulgaria peaking on the originally scheduled dates, as well as the host nation's restrictive entry requirements. As the 2021 World Junior Championships were already cancelled, the ISU announced that they would evaluate the feasibility of postponing the event until May 2022, if the Bulgarian Skating Federation was willing and other ISU member nations were willing to attend. The final decision was expected to be made at the ISU Council meeting on February 24, but was delayed to allow time to assess the impact of the Russian invasion of Ukraine. On February 27, the ISU announced that in light of the pandemic and the Russian invasion of Ukraine, the event would potentially be re-allocated. On March 4, the ISU announced that the event would be held from April 13–17 in Tallinn, Estonia, the second ISU Championships event of the season to be re-allocated to the Estonian Skating Union.

ISU member nations' response 
Due to travel restrictions caused by the pandemic, as well as varying vaccination requirements, several federations faced issues traveling to certain countries to compete. For example, Russia was unable to send athletes to France for the first two Junior Grand Prix events and required the ISU's re-allocation system to obtain additional quotas at other events. The federation also faced logistical difficulties in obtaining visas for their athletes at both Skate America and Skate Canada. Other federations limited international competitive opportunities for their skaters due to lengthy quarantine periods upon returning home. Both Japan and China did not send any athletes to the Junior Grand Prix, with China also skipping the entirety of the ISU Challenger Series; Japan only sent athletes to the latter events of the Challenger Series. China later also opted not to send any athletes to the World Championships or the World Junior Championships.

Season notes

Age eligibility 
Skaters are eligible to compete in ISU events on the junior or senior levels according to their age:

Changes 

If skaters of different nationalities team up, the ISU requires that they choose one country to represent.Date refers to date when the change occurred or, if not available, the date when the change was announced.

Partnership changes

Retirements

Coaching changes

Nationality changes

Competitions 

Several competitions were rescheduled from the previous season due to the COVID-19 pandemic.

Scheduled competitions:

Key

Cancelled 
Several competitions were cancelled by either the ISU, the host federation, or the local government due to the COVID-19 pandemic, some for a second consecutive season. Several others were cancelled following the Russian invasion of Ukraine.

International medalists

Men

Women

Pairs

Ice dance

Records and achievements

Records

Senior 
The following new senior ISU best scores were set during this season:

Junior 
The following new junior ISU best scores were set during this season:

Achievements 
 Olympic Games

 ISU Championships
  Deniss Vasiļjevs (bronze at 2022 Europeans) won Latvia's first ISU Championships medal.
 At 2022 Europeans,  Kamila Valieva recorded the highest-ever PCS and TES in the short program to break her own ISU record for the short program score.  Anastasia Mishina / Aleksandr Galliamov recorded the highest-ever PCS in the short program and TES in the free skating en route to breaking all three ISU records, including the free skating record set earlier in the event by  Evgenia Tarasova / Vladimir Morozov.
  Kana Muramoto / Daisuke Takahashi (silver at 2022 Four Continents) earned the highest placement for a Japanese ice dance team at an ISU Championships event. Takahashi is the first skater to earn a medal in two different disciplines at the Four Continents Championships, having previously won four medals in men's singles, including two golds.
  Cha Jun-hwan (gold at 2022 Four Continents) is the first Korean men's singles skater to win an ISU Championships event.
  Riku Miura / Ryuichi Kihara (silver at 2022 Worlds) earned the highest placement for a Japanese pair at the World Championships.
  Loena Hendrickx (silver at 2022 Worlds) is the first Belgian women's singles skater to win a medal at an ISU Championships event.
 At 2022 Worlds,  Gabriella Papadakis / Guillaume Cizeron recorded the highest-ever PCS and TES in the rhythm dance to break their own ISU record for the rhythm dance score. Papadakis / Cizeron also recorded highest-ever PCS in the free dance, and broke their own ISU records for the free dance and combined scores.
 At 2022 Junior Worlds,  Ilia Malinin recorded the highest-ever PCS for a junior man in the short program, and set the junior record for the short program score. Malinin also recorded both highest-ever TES and PCS for a junior man in the free skating, and broke the junior records for the free skating and combined scores.
  Karina Safina / Luka Berulava (gold at 2022 Junior Worlds) won Georgia's first ISU Championships title in any discipline. They also recorded the highest-ever PCS for a junior pairs in the short program.
  Mikhail Shaidorov (silver at 2022 Junior Worlds) won Kazakhstan's first World Junior Championships medal.

 ISU Grand Prix and Junior Grand Prix

 ISU Challenger Series and senior Bs
  Marilena Kitromilis (gold at 2021 CS Autumn Classic International) won Cyprus' first title at an ISU-sanctioned event.
 At 2021 CS Finlandia Trophy,  Kamila Valieva recorded the highest-ever TES for a woman in the free skating and broke ISU records for the free skating and combined scores.
 In the women's free skating at 2021 Budapest Trophy,  Maiia Khromykh became the 12th women to land a fully rotated quadruple jump in international competition.
 In the junior women's short program at 2021 Denis Ten Memorial Challenge,  Sofia Samodelkina became the 15th woman to successfully land a triple Axel in international competition.
 In the junior women's free skating at 2022 Bavarian Open,  Hana Yoshida became the 19th woman to successfully land a triple Axel in international competition.
 In the junior women's free skating at 2022 Coupe du Printemps,  Ami Nakai became the 20th woman to successfully land a triple Axel in international competition.

Season's best scores

Men

Best total score

Best short program score

Best free skating score

Women

Best total score

Best short program score

Best free skating score

Pairs

Best total score

Best short program score

Best free skating score

Ice dance

Best total score

Best rhythm dance score

Best free dance score

Highest element scores 
GOE = Grade of Execution
BV = Base value

Note: An 'x' after the base value means that the base value has been multiplied by 1.1 because the jump was executed in the second half of the program. A 'q' means that the jump was landed on the quarter (missing rotation of exactly one quarter revolution and receives full base value). A '<' indicates that the jump was under-rotated (missing rotation of more than one quarter revolution, but less than one half revolution). A '!' means an unclear edge on the takeoff of the jump.

Men

Highest valued single jumps

Highest valued combos

Women

Highest valued single jumps

Highest valued combos

Highest valued single triple Axels

Pairs

Highest valued twists

Highest valued throw jumps

Highest valued lifts

Highest valued jump combos

World Standings and Season's World Ranking

Current World Standings (top 30)

Men 
.

Women 
.

Pairs 
.

Ice dance 
.

Current Season's World Ranking (top 30)

Men 
.

Women 
.

Pairs 
.

Ice dance 
.

Notes

References 

Seasons in figure skating